The synchronized Pledge Across America is conducted each year on September 17 – Constitution Day. Pledge Across America is the nationally synchronized recitation of the Pledge of Allegiance in schools. In 2001 shortly after September 11 the President of the United States and the United States Secretary of Education and both the United States Senate and House of Representatives joined over 52 million students in the synchronized Pledge of Allegiance to the flag. September 17, 2008 marked the 17th year the Pledge Across America takes place, and it also marked 117 years since Francis Bellamy wrote and first recited the Pledge of Allegiance in 1892.

Sources

 https://web.archive.org/web/20081210074428/http://www.pledgeacrossamerica.org/
 http://www.celebrationusa.org/aboutus.htm
 http://www.linkedin.com/in/celebrationusa
 http://usgovinfo.about.com/library/weekly/aa101001a.htm
 http://www.ed.gov/news/photos/2001/1012/edlite-1012_1.html
 https://georgewbush-whitehouse.archives.gov/news/releases/2002/09/20020917-7.html

September events
Pledge of Allegiance